Özgener is a Turkish surname. Notable people with the surname include:

Hatice Özgener (1865–1940), Turkish politician
Mahmut Özgener (born 1963), Turkish football executive

Turkish-language surnames